The men's triple jump event at the 1971 European Athletics Indoor Championships was held on 14 March in Sofia.

Results

References

Triple jump at the European Athletics Indoor Championships
Triple